De Witte or Dewitte is Dutch and Flemish for "The White" and may refer to:

 The noble family "de Witte" (from Antwerpen)

Surname
 André de Witte (1944–2021), Belgian bishop in Brazil
 Bruno de Witte (born 1955), Belgian legal scholar
 Chris De Witte (born 1978), Belgian footballer
 Emanuel de Witte (1617–1692), Dutch perspective painter
  (1882–1952), Czech politician
 Gaspar de Witte (1624–1681), Flemish painter
 Gaston-François de Witte (1897–1980), Belgian herpetologist
 Hans de Witte (1583–1630), German financier
 Ivan De Witte (born 1947), Belgian entrepreneur and football executive
  (1738–1809), Flemish architect, who designed the fortification of Tallinn
 Jacomina de Witte (1582–1661), Dutch woman central in a famous corruption case
 Jan de Witte (bishop) (1475–1540), Flemish priest, first Bishop of Cuba
 Jan de Witte (1709–1785), Dutch-Polish military engineer and architect
 Jeremy Dewitte (born 1972), American police impersonator and sex offender
 Jean de Witte (1808–1889), Belgian archeologist, epigraphist and numismatist
 Léon de Witte de Haelen (1857–1933), Belgian general of World War I
 Laura de Witte (born 1995), Dutch sprinter
 Lisanne de Witte (born 1992), Dutch sprinter
 Lieven de Witte (15th century), Flemish painter
 Lodewijk De Witte (born 1954), Belgian politician, governor of Flemish Brabant
 Ludo De Witte (born 1956), Belgian writer
 Peter de Witte (Peter Candid), (c.1548–1628), Flemish-born painter, tapestry designer and draughtsman
 Peter de Witte III (1617–1667), Flemish Baroque painter
 Pieter de Witte (c. 1548 – 1628), Flemish Mannerist painter and architect
 Ronald De Witte (born 1946), Belgian bicycle racer
 Seth De Witte (born 1987), Belgian footballer
 De Witte family, a Belgian noble family from Antwerp

See also

Witte

Dutch-language surnames
Surnames of Belgian origin